Janet Richard (born 3 July 1998) is a Maltese athlete. She competed in the women's 400 metres event at the 2019 World Athletics Championships. She did not advance to compete in the semi-finals.

References

External links

1998 births
Living people
Maltese female sprinters
Place of birth missing (living people)
World Athletics Championships athletes for Malta